West End, New Jersey may refer to:

 West End, Trenton, New Jersey
 West End, Monmouth County, New Jersey
 West End, Jersey City
 West End Junction (Jersey City)